Grassbird may refer to:

Bristled grassbird (Chaetornis striata), a passerine bird making up the monotypic genus Chaetornis
One of two species of grassbird in the genus Schoenicola:
Broad-tailed grassbird (Schoenicola platyurus)
Fan-tailed grassbird (Schoenicola brevirostris)
Cape grassbird (Sphenoeacus afer), an African warbler, formerly placed in the family Sylviidae
Rufous-rumped grassbird (Graminicola bengalensis), a species of babbler in a monotypic genus in the family Timaliidae:
Two species of grassbird in the genus Poodytes:
Fly River grassbird (Poodytes albolimbatus)
Little grassbird (Poodytes gramineus)
One species of grassbird in the genus Helopsaltes:
Marsh grassbird (Helopsaltes pryeri)
Two species of grassbird in the genus Cincloramphus:
Papuan grassbird (Cincloramphus macrurus)
Tawny grassbird (Cincloramphus timoriensis)
One species of grassbird in the genus Megalurus:
Striated grassbird (Megalurus palustris)

The Grey emutail (Bradypterus seebohmi) is also known as the Madagascan grassbird

Animal common name disambiguation pages